Henry S. Berninger (February 1, 1864 – May 18, 1934) was an American businessman and politician.

Born in the town of Wauwatosa, Wisconsin, Berninger went to the Milwaukee parochial and public schools. He was a businessman. In 1889, Berninger served on the Wauwatosa Town Board and was a Republican. In 1915, Berninger served in the Wisconsin State Assembly. Berninger died of a heart attack at his home in Milwaukee, Wisconsin.

Notes

External links

1864 births
1934 deaths
People from Wauwatosa, Wisconsin
Businesspeople from Wisconsin
Wisconsin city council members
Republican Party members of the Wisconsin State Assembly